101.8 WCR FM is a radio station that broadcasts to the city of Wolverhampton, England, on the VHF frequency of 101.8 under an Ofcom - Community Radio licence, at 6:00 a.m. on 30 March 2007 originally from studios in the Newhampton Arts Centre. WCR FM aims to be a vibrant, informative and hyperlocal station providing the city with an alternative service with a mix of speech, specialist and niche programming. The station's licence states it must broadcast a speech content of no less than 30% of its total output and this is achieved primarily by a weekday lunchtime magazine show and a heavier, local news/current affairs series with the station's Community Director, Chris Allen. Other programmes offer additional speech content to cover the requirement.

It operates from a purpose developed three-studio broadcast, production and training complex on the second floor of the Mander Centre following a move from their launch studios at Newhampton Arts Centre in April 2022.

Programme content is primarily produced in-house with a degree of syndicated programming from external sources. Wolverhampton has a mixed-race population of approximately 260,000 and although primarily an English-language station, WCR FM also offers a broadcasting platform for various ethnic and community groups.

Presenters
All presenters are volunteers and host a variety of mainstream and specialist shows. The station has also attracted former commercial presenters:

Dicky Dodd Signal 107 Beacon Radio Wyvern FM WABC
Stuart Hickman Beacon Radio Centre FM Radio Hafren Radio Maldwyn
Andy Walters
Les Ross BRMB Saga 105.7FM
Andy Swift Buzz FM Beacon Radio BBC Radio WM
Chris Allen BRMB
Tim Beech BBC Radio WM BBC Radio Shropshire
Steven Beech Sunshine Radio Touch FM Telford FM TalkSPORT BBC Radio WM
Jim Duncan WABC
Sue Vickers
Jason Forrest
Paul Newman (no, not that one)
Rosie Kendrick
Lyndon Edwards
Jack Haywood
Garry Foster
Alex Scott
KKJ Beacon Radio
Niel Jackson Signal 107 Beacon Radio Centre FM BBC Radio Shropshire
Chris Weaving
Hitsville Chalky
Debbie Huxton
Alan Nicklin Signal 107 Beacon Radio WABC
David King
Chris Harper
Steve Welch 107.7 The Wolf

History 
WCR FM is related to Wolverhampton Campus Radio, WCR AM, which broadcast to the Wulfrun campus of Wolverhampton College.

Ofcom Breaches
In March 2023, WCR FM were found in breach by OFCOM in March 2023 after playing a song that contained offensive language. WCR FM were found in breach of Rules 1.14 and 2.3 after playing a song during its Drivetime programme on 2 November 2022 that contained the "F" word. 

The full response can be seen at: https://www.ofcom.org.uk/__data/assets/pdf_file/0033/254796/Ofcom-Decision-Drive-Time-with-James-Levett,-WCR-FM.pdf

References

External links
 
WCRFM on Facebook

Radio stations in the West Midlands (region)
Community radio stations in the United Kingdom
Mass media in Wolverhampton
2007 establishments in England